South Korean boy band Tomorrow X Together, also known as TXT, has released three studio albums, one reissue, six extended plays, 22 singles—including six soundtrack appearances—and 32 music videos. , the group has sold over 3.3 million albums domestically and is the 10th best-selling Korean act in Gaon Chart history within the last ten years.

Formed by Big Hit Entertainment, the group made its debut in March 2019 with the extended play (EP) The Dream Chapter: Star, which debuted and peaked at number one on the South Korean Gaon Album Chart—it was certified Platinum by the Korea Music Content Association (KMCA) in November 2020. The EP entered the Billboard 200 in the United States at number 140 as the highest-charting debut album by any male K-pop group at the time, and also achieved number-one on the World Albums chart, while its lead single "Crown" topped the World Digital Songs chart, making TXT the fastest K-pop group to appear on and simultaneously lead both World rankings. The group released its first studio album, The Dream Chapter: Magic, on October 21, 2019. The album sold more than 124,000 copies in its first week and became TXT's second number-one on the Gaon Album Chart. It was the group's first work to debut on Billboards Heatseekers Albums chart, entering at number six. Four of the album's eight tracks entered the World Digital Songs chart—lead single "9 and Three Quarters (Run Away)" debuted at number two, while the other three songs charted at numbers 16, 18, and 21 respectively. The album received Platinum certification from the KMCA in September 2020.

The group's first Japanese single "Magic Hour" was released on January 15, 2020. It debuted at number two on the weekly Oricon Singles Chart, and was eventually certified Gold by the Recording Industry Association of Japan (RIAJ) for selling over 100,000 physical units. The group's second Korean-language EP, The Dream Chapter: Eternity, was released on May 18. Sales crossed 181,000 copies during the first week and the EP entered the Gaon Album Chart at number two. It was certified Platinum by the KMCA in under two months, marking TXT's first certification in their home country since debut. The EP debuted at number one on the Oricon Albums Chart, giving the group its first chart-topper in Japan, and number four on the World Albums chart. The EP was the 28th best-selling record of 2020 in South Korea with over 358,000 copies sold. On August 19, the group's second Japanese single "Drama" was released. It debuted and peaked at number three on the Oricon Singles Chart and also received Gold certification from the RIAJ. TXT released its third Korean-language EP, Minisode1: Blue Hour, on October 26. The EP exceeded domestic sales of over 300,000 copies in its first week and opened at number three on the Gaon Album Chart. It was certified Platinum by the KMCA on December 10, and ended the year as the 19th best-selling record of 2020 in South Korea, having sold over 476,000 copies in just two months. It entered the Oricon Albums Chart in first place, and became the group's second number-one in Japan. In the US, it peaked atop the World Albums chart and debuted at number 25 on the Billboard 200, marking a new career high for the group as its first top-100 entry on the ranking.

On January 20, 2021, TXT released its first Japanese studio album, Still Dreaming. The album became the group's third consecutive number one on the Oricon Albums Chart—after The Dream Chapter: Eternity and Minisode1: Blue Hour—with first week sales exceeding 86,000 copies. It is the group's first album sell over 100,000 copies in Japan and its third release to earn Gold certification from the RIAJ. TXT's second Korean studio album, The Chaos Chapter: Freeze, released on May 31, became the group's fourth number-one in South Korea, and its fourth consecutive number-one in Japan—it attained Gold certification in June. The album's debut at number five on the Billboard 200 made it the highest-charting album of 2021 by a K-pop act at the time,—TXT are the seventh K-pop act to enter the top five. It also marked the group's first top-10 entry and highest placement overall on the chart.

Studio albums

Reissues

Extended plays

Singles

Other charted songs

Videography

Music videos

Other videos

DVD

See also
 List of songs recorded by Tomorrow X Together

Notes

References

 
Discographies of South Korean artists
Hip hop group discographies
K-pop music group discographies